Eric Bugenhagen (born October 19, 1987) is an American professional wrestler and former collegiate wrestler. He is currently signed to WWE, where he performs on the Raw brand under the ring name Rick Boogs.

Aside from his wrestling career, Bugenhagen also runs a YouTube channel focused on weight training and comedy.

Amateur wrestling career
After winning a state title while at Franklin High School in Franklin, Wisconsin, Bugenhagen wrestled for the NCAA Division I University of Wisconsin team under Barry Davis. Bugenhagen competed for the Wisconsin Badgers from 2006 to 2011, starting at 184 pounds in his sophomore season and at heavyweight his junior and senior years. Bugenhagen twice competed at the NCAA Championships, qualifying for the 2010 and 2011 tournaments in Omaha, Nebraska, and Philadelphia, respectively. He went 2-4 at the NCAAs and also wrestled in a U.S. Olympic Trials qualifier. He graduated with a degree in kinesiology and worked as a wrestling coach for his alma mater after graduating.

Professional wrestling career

WWE (2017–present) 
Bugenhagen made his professional wrestling debut on the October 19, 2017 episode of WWE NXT Live, where he fell short to Lars Sullivan in a singles match. After an injury set him back significantly, he returned to wrestling at NXT live events under the ring name Ric Boog. Under his real name, Bugenhagen lost to Drew Gulak on February 6, 2019 on NXT in his television debut. On the May 1, 2019 episode of WWE Worlds Collide, he participated in a 20-man battle royal as Rik Bugez, competing against other popular superstars such as Brian Kendrick, Akira Tozawa, Drew Gulak, Tyler Bate and the winner Roderick Strong. On the February 21, 2019 episode of WWE NXT Live, Bugez teamed up with Denzel Dejournette to unsuccessfully face the NXT Tag Team Champions of the time, The Viking Raiders (Ivar and Erik). A notable confrontation of his career took place on the February 22, 2020 episode of WWE NXT Live, where Bugez competed against Finn Balor in a losing effort.

Bugez made several appearances as an extra in the main shows, being one of the many NXT performers being used as part of a makeshift crowd on Raw at the beginning of the COVID-19 pandemic in 2020. Leading up to WrestleMania 37, Bugez played Old Spice representative character Joseph Average/The Nightpanther in several backstage advertisements at Fastlane and after WrestleMania 37, during which he defeated R-Truth and Akira Tozawa to capture the WWE 24/7 Championship twice.

On May 21, 2021, Bugez, now going by the tweaked ring name Rick Boogs, made his debut on SmackDown, playing Shinsuke Nakamura to the ring with an electric guitar. He made his in ring debut on the August 20 episode of SmackDown, teaming with Nakamura to defeat Apollo Crews and Commander Azeez. At WrestleMania 38, Boogs and Nakamura faced The Usos for the SmackDown Tag Team Championship, in which The Usos retained. During the match, Boogs suffered a torn quadriceps/patellar tendon injury, requiring surgery.

After a nine month absence due to injury, Boogs made his return on the January 30, 2023, episode of Raw being introduced as the newest member of the roster before defeating The Miz in an impromptu match.

Evolve (2020)
Bugenhagen, as Rik Bugez, worked his first match in the independent scene at EVOLVE 143, an event promoted by Evolve during their relationship with WWE on January 17, 2020, where he faced Joe Gacy in a losing effort. One night later, at EVOLVE 144, Bugez scored his first victory by defeating Anthony Greene.

Other media
Bugenhagen, as Rick Boogs, made his video game debut in the Clowning Around DLC for WWE 2K22.

Championships and accomplishments
Pro Wrestling Illustrated
Ranked No. 224 of the top 500 singles wrestlers in the PWI 500 in 2022
WWE
WWE 24/7 Championship (2 times)

References

External links
 
 
 

1987 births
Living people
American male professional wrestlers
WWE 24/7 Champions
American YouTubers
21st-century professional wrestlers